Rafinesquia, commonly known as plumeseed, is a genus of flowering plants in the family Asteraceae, native to the western United States and northwestern Mexico.

The genus was named for polymath Constantine Samuel Rafinesque by botanist Thomas Nuttall in 1841.

Species
Rafinesquia consists of two species:
 Rafinesquia californica Nutt. (California plumeseed, California chicory) - Baja California, Sonora, USA (CA OR NV AZ UT)
 Rafinesquia neomexicana A.Gray (New Mexico plumeseed, desert chicory) - Baja California, Sonora, USA (CA NV AZ UT NM TX)

References

External links
Rafinesquia californica at Calflora
Rafinesquia neomexicana at Calflora
US Department of Agriculture Plants Database: Rafinesquia

Cichorieae
Asteraceae genera
Flora of North America
Taxa named by Thomas Nuttall